Okarvi is an Urdu surname signifying association with the city of Okara, Pakistan. Notable people with this surname include:

 Ghulam Ali Okarvi, Pakistani religious scholar
 Kaukab Noorani Okarvi (born 1957), Pakistani religious scholar
 Muhammad Shafee Okarvi (1930–1984), Pakistani religious scholar

See also 
Okara (disambiguation)

Urdu-language surnames
Toponymic surnames
People from Okara, Pakistan
Nisbas
Surnames of Pakistani origin